Thomas William Lynch (20 July 1927 – 29 December 2006) was a New Zealand rugby union and rugby league footballer. He played three rugby union internationals for New Zealand in 1951, before switching codes and joining English club Halifax (Heritage № 640), for whom he made 188 appearances between 1951 and 1956.

Rugby union
He played ten matches for the All Blacks on their tour of Australia that year, including three internationals, scoring 27 points in all.

Rugby league
In November 1951, Lynch accepted a contract to play professional rugby league for the Halifax club in England. At the time, his signing fee of £5000 was a record for a New Zealand player paid by an English club. He played for Halifax until 1956, making 188 appearances, scoring 112 tries and nine goals.

Challenge Cup final appearances
Lynch played  in Halifax's 4–all draw with Warrington in the 1954 Challenge Cup final during the 1953–54 season at Wembley Stadium, London on Saturday 24 April 1954, in front of a crowd of 81,841. He also played at centre in the 4–8 defeat by Warrington in the replay at Odsal Stadium, Bradford on Wednesday 5 May 1954, in front of a record crowd of 102,575 or more.

He later played in the 2–13 defeat by St. Helens in the 1956 Challenge Cup final during the 1955–56 season at Wembley Stadium on Saturday 28 April 1956.

International honours
Lynch won four caps for Other Nationalities while at Halifax.

Legacy
Lynch's testimonial match at Halifax took place in 1956. He is a Halifax Hall of Fame inductee.

Death
Lynch died in Geraldine on 29 December 2006.

References

1927 births
2006 deaths
People from Naseby, New Zealand
New Zealand rugby league players
New Zealand rugby union players
New Zealand international rugby union players
Otago rugby union players
Canterbury rugby union players
Rugby union centres
Halifax R.L.F.C. players
New Zealand expatriate rugby league players
Expatriate rugby league players in England
New Zealand expatriate sportspeople in England
Other Nationalities rugby league team players
Rugby league centres